Many presidents of the United States have written autobiographies about their presidencies and/or (some periods of) their life before their time in office. Some 19th-century U.S. presidents who wrote autobiographies are James Buchanan and Ulysses S. Grant, though Grant's autobiography is about his time as general during the U.S. Civil War and not about his presidency. Presidential memoir has proved to be a lasting and popular genre—every president since Calvin Coolidge has published one after leaving office, and more recent entries have earned their authors tens of millions of dollars in royalties.

Autobiographies covering the period of their presidency
Note: Only publication information for the first edition is given.

Autobiographies not covering the period of their presidency

Published diaries and papers

See also
 List of memoirs by first ladies of the United States
 List of American political memoirs

Notes

Further reading

External links to free-access presidential autobiographical works
Thomas Jefferson's autobiography
Martin Van Buren's autobiography
James Buchanan's autobiography
Ulysses S. Grant's autobiography
Theodore Roosevelt's autobiography
Calvin Coolidge's autobiography
Herbert Hoover's autobiography 

Autobiographies
United States Presidential autobiographies